Femke Verstichelen (born 22 March 1984) is a Belgian professional racing cyclist, who last rode for Lviv Cycling Team in 2020.

Life and career 

Verstichelen is a transgender woman. She debuted in male cyclist teams in 2004, and women categories in 2012.

Major results 

 2013
 10th Belgian National Time Trial Championships

 2017
 9th Belgian National Road Race Championships

 2022
 1st Ladies Cycling Trophy

References

External links 

1984 births
Living people
Belgian female cyclists
Sportspeople from Aalst, Belgium
Transgender sportswomen
Transgender women
Belgian transgender people
Belgium LGBT sportspeople
LGBT cyclists